Jorge Temudo, O.P. was a Roman Catholic prelate who served as the Bishop of Goa (1567–1571) and the first Bishop of Cochin (1558–1567).

Biography
Jorge Temudo was ordained a priest in the Order of Preachers and consecrated bishop in Lisbon on 15 Apr 1560. 
On 4 Feb 1558, he was appointed during the papacy of Pope Paul IV as Bishop of Cochin.
On 13 Jan 1567, he was appointed during the papacy of Pope Pius V as Bishop of Goa.
He served as Bishop of Goa until his death on 29 Apr 1571.

References

External links
 
  
 
  

16th-century Roman Catholic bishops in India
Bishops appointed by Pope Paul IV
Bishops appointed by Pope Pius V
Dominican bishops
1571 deaths